The Triplets is an ice-free three-pointed hill rising to 160 m at the southwest extremity of Alfatar Peninsula, Robert Island in the South Shetland Islands, Antarctica and surmounting Coppermine Cove to the northwest, Mitchell Cove to the southeast, and English Strait to the west and south.  Aconcagua Point  is formed by an offshoot of the hill.

The Triplets were charted and descriptively named by Discovery Investigations personnel in 1935.  Aconcagua Point was named by the 1948-49 Chilean Antarctic Expedition after the province of Aconcagua, Chile.

Location

See also
 Alfatar Peninsula
 Robert Island

Map
 L.L. Ivanov. Antarctica: Livingston Island and Greenwich, Robert, Snow and Smith Islands. Scale 1:120000 topographic map.  Troyan: Manfred Wörner Foundation, 2009.

References
 SCAR Composite Antarctic Gazetteer.

Landforms of Robert Island